John Westley Rogers Jr. (born December 16, 1940) is an American politician from the state of Alabama. A member of the Democratic Party, Rogers serves in the Alabama House of Representatives, representing the 52nd district.

Rogers has a bachelor's degree from Tennessee State University, a master's degree from the University of Alabama, and an associate's degree from the University of Alabama at Birmingham.

Political positions
Rogers personally opposes abortion but represents a pro-choice district and votes accordingly.

Abortion comments controversy
On May 1, 2019, Rogers states, during a filibuster in opposition to a bill, designed as a challenge to Roe v. Wade, that would make performing or attempting to perform an abortion in Alabama a felony:

“Some children are just unwanted. You either kill them now or you kill them later in the electric chair.”

“Some parents can’t handle a child with problems. It could be retarded. It might have no arms and no legs.”

Rogers' comments were widely decried in the media, by conservative pundits, and by the Alabama House Democratic Caucus. Senator Doug Jones, a friend of Rogers', called him to let him know that the comments were hurtful and that he would condemn them publicly.

Also criticised by Donald Trump Jr, Rogers stated the following day, May 2, 2019, that he should have been aborted and that there was something mentally wrong with him. Rogers later apologized for using the word "retarded" in his criticism of Trump Jr.

References

External links
Representative John W. Rogers, Jr.

1940 births
Living people
Politicians from Birmingham, Alabama
Democratic Party members of the Alabama House of Representatives
Tennessee State University alumni
University of Alabama alumni
University of Alabama at Birmingham alumni
21st-century American politicians